State Road 212 (NM 212) is a  state highway in the US state of New Mexico. NM 212's southern terminus is at NM 272, and the northern terminus is at U.S. Route 60 (US 60) and US 84 east of Fort Sumner

Major intersections

See also

References

212
Transportation in De Baca County, New Mexico